Jorhuari or Ccorhuari (possibly from Aymara for mold) is a mountain in the Apolobamba mountain range in the Andes of Peru, about  high. It is located in the Puno Region, Putina Province, Ananea District, and in the Sandia Province, Cuyocuyo District. It lies southwest of the mountain Vilacota.

References 

Mountains of Puno Region
Mountains of Peru